Kathleen Case (born Catherine Walker, also credited Cathy Case, Kathy Case, and Cassie Case; July 31, 1933 – July 22, 1979) was an American film and television actress and a ballerina.

Early life and career
Case was born on July 31, 1933, in Pittsburgh, Pennsylvania, and she grew up in Cincinnati. Her mother died three days after Case's birth, and she was raised by her grandmother, Mrs. Ira Hamilton Case.  

When she was 11 years old she first performed professionally, dancing in Cincinnati as part of the Metropolitan Opera's summer season. She later danced with the Ballet Theater and was ballerina with the San Carlo Opera Company.

Columbia Pictures signed Case to a term contract in 1954. During her acting  career she performed in films such as Human Desire (1954), Last of the Pony Riders (1953), and Running Wild (1955). She also appeared in a variety of American television series produced in the 1950s and early 1960s.

Personal life and death
Case was seriously injured in a power boat accident in February 1959 and was in the hospital for more than two months.

On February 5, 1967, Case was driving in Hollywood, California, when her car collided head-on with a vehicle driven by actor Dirk Rambo, the twin brother of actor Dack Rambo. A car fire resulted. Dirk Rambo was killed, and his passenger, Horace H. Hester, was seriously injured. A Los Angeles municipal court judge dismissed felony drunken driving and manslaughter charges against her two months later.

Case died in North Hollywood, California, shortly before her 46th birthday.

Filmography

References

Bibliography
 Blottner, Gene. Columbia Pictures Movie Series, 1926-1955: The Harry Cohn Years. McFarland, 2011.

External links

1933 births
1979 deaths
American film actresses
American television actresses
20th-century American actresses
American female dancers